Seasonal Film Corporation was an independent film company from Hong Kong, originally founded by the ex-assistant Shaw Brothers movie director Ng See-yuen in 1974. One of their first films was Call Me Dragon in 1974, starring Bruce Liang, Kurata Yasuaki and Mang Hoi. Seasonal Film Corporation was one of the well known independent filming company in Hong Kong and who was also responsible with likes of martial arts stars such as Jackie Chan, Hwang Jang-lee, Jean-Claude Van Damme, Yuen Woo Ping, Bruce Liang, Alan Chui Chung-San and Corey Yuen.

Beginning
Ng See-yuen originally started the company in Hong Kong in 1974, starting off with a few of the Bruce Liang movie titles with the likes of Call me Dragon, Bruce Lee, D-Day at Macao (Little Superman) and European and HK co-production Kidnap in Rome. Soon, their popularity started to rise when they released the movie Secret Rivals in 1976 and its following sequel Secret Rivals 2 in 1977, marking the most successful films through the late 70s.

Other films produced by the company through Ng (during 1974 to early 1978) include Hong Kong crime film Anti-Corruption (1975), and comedy film What Price? - Stardom (1977). Despite these early films from Seasonal did not gain much attention as their later films, the production quality still gained positive reaction and slowly making a Seasonal Films one of the household company in Hong Kong film industry.

Popularity and the early '80s period
The company started to get more attention when Yuen Woo-ping marks his first director debut on both Drunken Master and Snake in the Eagle's Shadow with the likes of Jackie Chan and Hwang Jang-lee. Giving a chance for Jackie Chan to approach more on a comedic kung fu style, soon the production companies two Yuen Woo Ping films not only expand the popularity of Jackie Chan, but also giving a proper position for Ng See Yuen to set his company as their own independent filmmaking company.

The company further goes down with popularity a bit more, the directors like Tsui Hark marked his first two debut films such as The Butterfly Murders and We're Going to Eat You through 1979 to 1980.

The company is also responsible with semi- Japanese and Hong Kong co-production film under the Corey Yuen's first director debut film called Ninja in the Dragon's Den starring Conan Lee and Hiroyuki Sanada, popularising the Ninja movies genre in Hong Kong and it was also very successful in Japanese's film market as a whole.

Other films throughout the late '70s to early '80s (particularly till 1978~1982) include Leslie Cheung'''s feature debut adult film Erotic Dreams of Red Chamber (1978), follow up sequel to Drunken Master known as Dance of the Drunk Mantis (1979), several action-packed acrobatic flicks such as Two Fists Against the Law, Ring of Death and The Lackey and the Lady Tiger all in which released in 1980s, historical kung fu film based on Huo Yuan Jia known as Legend of a Fighter (1982) and epic Hong Kong war battle with Chow Yun-fat and Rosamund Kwan known as The Head Hunter (1982).

Hollywood Pictures
Ng See Yuen began to expand his production company further, they began to release some of the American style of kickboxing movies with New World Pictures, hence further expanding the No Retreat, No Surrender trilogy through 1986 to 1989.

Some of the Seasonal Film's Hollywood picture is also responsible for bringing up the likes of stars such as Jean-Claude Van Damme and Kurt McKinney who made their debut in the first No Retreat, No Surrender film.

Defunct
One of the Seasonal Film Corporation's last film was Wu Jing's 2008 film Legendary Assassin. The film was defunct around late 2008. Ng See-yuen later became a chairman of the several Hong Kong Film industry.

Films

Hong Kong ProductionBloody Fist (1972)Bruce Lee, D-Day at Macao (Little Superman) (1974)Call me Dragon (1974)Anti Corruption (1975)Secret Rivals(1976)Secret Rivals 2 (1977)What Price? - Stardom (1977)Snake in the Eagle's Shadow (1978)Drunken Master (1978)Erotic Dreams of Red Chamber (1978)Kung Fu Vs. Yoga (1979)Dance of the Drunk Mantis (Drunken Master Part 2)(1979)The Butterfly Murders (1979)Two for the Road (1980)We're Going to Eat You (1980)Without a Promised Land (1980)Lackey and the Lady Tiger (1980)The Ring of Death (1980)Two Fists Against the Law (1980)The Sweet and Sour Cop (1981)Game of Death II (Tower of Death) (1981)Legend of a Fighter (1982)Ninja in the Dragon's Den (1982)The Head Hunter (1982)Walks on Fire (1987)Mister Mistress (1988)All for the Winner (1990)Dragon Inn (1992)Twin Dragons (1992)Green Snake (1993)Evening Liaison (1996)Bloodmoon (1997)Deja Vu (1999)Legendary Assassin (2008)

DocumentariesThe Art of High Impact Kicking (Documentary)(1981)Tiger and Crane Shaolin Kung Fu (Documentary)(1981)

Hollywood FilmsNo Retreat, No Surrender (1986)No Retreat, No Surrender 2 (1987)No Retreat, No Surrender 3: Blood Brothers (1989)The King of the Kickboxers (1990)American Shaolin (1991)Superfights (1995)Bloodmoon'' (1997)

External links

Cinema chains in Hong Kong
Film production companies of Hong Kong
Film distributors of China
Mass media companies established in 1974
1974 establishments in Hong Kong
Kowloon
Mass media companies disestablished in 2008
2008 disestablishments in Hong Kong